Dany Abounaoum (born 23 October 1969) is a Lebanese alpine skier. He competed in the 1992 Winter Olympics.

References

1969 births
Living people
Alpine skiers at the 1992 Winter Olympics
Lebanese male alpine skiers
Olympic alpine skiers of Lebanon